Āzādeh is a Roman slave-girl harpist in Shahnameh and other works in Persian literature. When Bahram-e Gur (Bahram V) was in al-Hirah, Azadeh became his companion. She always accompanies Bahram in hunting.

Her story with Bahram is mentioned in other works such as Nezami Ganjavi's Bahramnameh (also known as Haft Paykar) and Tha'alibi's Ḡorar. Azadeh appears as Dilaram (heart's ease) in Hasht-Behest by Amir Khusrau.

Bahram and Azadeh hunting was a popular subject in Persian miniature, and other media, such as mina'i ware paintings.   The moment usually shown is when Azadeh challenges the king to pin a gazelle's foot to its shoulder with an arrow (when raising the foot to scratch itself); Bahram achieves this.

References 

Women in Shahnameh
Harpists
Fictional Greek and Roman slaves